This is a list of notable hentai anime. Hentai is anime and manga that contains pornographic content.

See also 
 List of hentai authors (groups, studios, productions companies, circles)

References

 
 List
Pornographic animation
Hentai